Saltash, sometimes called Essa, was a "rotten borough" in Cornwall which returned two Members of Parliament to the House of Commons in the English and later British Parliament from 1552 to 1832, when it was abolished by the Great Reform Act.

History
The borough consisted of the town of Saltash, a market town facing Plymouth and Devonport across the Tamar estuary, and the inhabitants by 1831 were mainly fishermen or Devonport dockworkers. Like most of the Cornish boroughs enfranchised or re-enfranchised during the Tudor period, it was a rotten borough from the start.

Saltash was a burgage borough, meaning that the right to vote rested with the tenants of certain specified properties. For a long period in the 18th century, there was a contest for control of the borough between the government and the Buller family of Morval, depending partly on legal uncertainties over the precise number and identity of the burgage properties to which votes were attached. In the 1760s it was considered an entirely secure Admiralty borough, where the naval influence could sway all the voters, but by 1831 the Bullers owned all the tenancies and considered themselves the patrons.

In 1831, the borough had a population of 1,637, and 245 houses.

Members of Parliament

MPs 1547–1629

MPs 1640–1832

References

Sources 
D Brunton & D H Pennington, “Members of the Long Parliament” (London: George Allen & Unwin, 1954)
Cobbett's Parliamentary history of England, from the Norman Conquest in 1066 to the year 1803 (London: Thomas Hansard, 1808)
 Maija Jansson (ed.), Proceedings in Parliament, 1614 (House of Commons) (Philadelphia: American Philosophical Society, 1988)
J Holladay Philbin, "Parliamentary Representation 1832 - England and Wales" (New Haven: Yale University Press, 1965)
 

Parliamentary constituencies in Cornwall (historic)
Constituencies of the Parliament of the United Kingdom established in 1552
Constituencies of the Parliament of the United Kingdom disestablished in 1832
Rotten boroughs